Fatehpur is a panchayat village in the Pundri tehsil of Kaithal district of Haryana, India. Earlier it formed part of the Kurukshetra and Karnal districts.

The population of Fatehpur village was 15,787 in 2011, which was almost five times the average size for villages in the district. The infrastructure is well-developed, including a nearby power station.

Fatehpur is famous for its Mata Devi shrine

The village is also known colloquially as Fatehpur-Pundri for the adjoining town of Pundri.
Near by village Pundri Rural.

Language

The native language of Fatehpur is Hindi, Punjabi and most of the village people speak Hindi, Punjabi. Fatehpur people use Hindi, Punjabi language for communication.

Education
Pundri has many schools and colleges. A government school that exists is called the Rural College of Agriculture

Notables
 Dinesh Kaushik (politician), current MLA of Pundri Constituency and Brahmin leader of Haryana

References

External links
 Kaithal district, official website

Villages in Kaithal district